Siôn Russell Jones is a Welsh singer and songwriter. Jones was born in Cardiff, Wales, he started playing the guitar at the age of 7 and studied music at the University of Glamorgan (now the University of South Wales).

Music career
In October 2010, Jones released his debut solo album And Suddenly via Still Small Voice Music, and the single 'Indestructible' became BBC Radio Wales single of the week. And Suddenly's songs was used in the background on the British soap operas Coronation Street and EastEnders. He's also had songs featured in the Welsh comedy Stella.

Jones has signed a publishing deal with BDi music, the label published by Jake Gosling who worked with Ed Sheeran on + (album). And he also signed a deal with Stonebridge guitars the same year.

During the summer of 2011, he performed at several UK festivals, including The Acoustic Festival of Britain, Festival of the Celts, and Green Man Festival, and has also played in many music festivals such as Liverpool Sound City, Sŵn, Hop Farm Festival, Croissant neuf, The Great Escape Festival. Also he opened a concert for Newton Faulkner. To date as part of a band or playing solo he has played over 500 concerts since 2013, and since 2021 Jones has released 6 albums and 2 singles.

International tours
As well as touring the United Kingdom, Jones has also played concerts in Belgium, Holland, Switzerland, France, Austria, Germany, Sweden and Japan.  In March 2012, Jones performed at the SXSW musical festival in Austin, Texas, and the sister festival North by Northeast in Toronto, Canada, and also at the Rockwood Music Hall in New York city.

Angel Hotel
Since 2020, Jones became a founding member of the 80's indie-pop band 'Angel Hotel' alongside Carys Jones (bass, vocals, graphic design), Jordan Dibble (drums), Barny Southgate (virtuosic keys).

References

External links

Living people
Date of birth missing (living people)
Welsh male singers
Welsh singer-songwriters
Musicians from Cardiff
Alumni of the University of South Wales
Alumni of the University of Glamorgan
Year of birth missing (living people)
British male singer-songwriters